Jules Louis Verbecke (born 15 September 1879, date of death unknown) was a French swimmer and water polo player who won a silver medal in the Men's 200 metre team swimming event at the 1900 Summer Olympics. He also participated in the Water polo at the 1900 Summer Olympics.

References

External links
 

1879 births
Sportspeople from Lille
Water polo players at the 1900 Summer Olympics
Olympic water polo players of France
French male freestyle swimmers
Olympic swimmers of France
Swimmers at the 1900 Summer Olympics
Olympic silver medalists for France
Year of death missing
Olympic silver medalists in swimming
French male water polo players
Medalists at the 1900 Summer Olympics
French male long-distance swimmers
Place of death missing